Sirivantha is a 2006 Indian Kannada-language film starring Vishnuvardhan. This film was directed by S. Narayan. It was the sixth and last film of the Vishnu-Narayan combination. Sirivantha followed the other five Vishnu-Narayan films Veerappa Nayaka, Surya Vamsha, Simhadriya Simha, Jamindaru and Varsha. The movie is a remake of 2004 Telugu movie Aa Naluguru.

Cast
 Vishnuvardhan as Narayan Murthy
 Shruthi as Lakshmi 
 Doddanna as Kondaiah 
 Srinath as Subbu
 Avinash
 K. S. Ashwath
 Bhuvan Chandra
 Ravi Chethan
 Hemalatha
 Hemashree
 Shivaram as Seenayya

Plot
Sirivantha revolves around the concept of ideologies and being self-sufficient in life. Narayan Murthy (Vishnu) is a very kindhearted and a peace-loving person. He works as an editor for a newspaper Mitravani and believes in the ideology of being helpful. He spends half of his earnings on his family and the other half to help the needy. His family consists of his wife, two sons and a daughter. They are dead set against the principles followed by their father. There is an urgent need in the family for some money because the eldest son needs to pay a bribe to get a Sub Inspector's job and the youngest son needs to get through his education. So Narayan decides to start a business. He is forced to break all his principles and borrow money from a financier friend, played by Doddanna. Unable to bear the defeat of his ideology, he commits suicide the very day he gives money to his children. After hearing about their father's death, the children run away with the money and hide while the society that he helped and loved come in huge numbers to perform his last rites. The rest is how the financier gets his money back and how the children understand the value of life.

Soundtrack
All songs were composed by S. A. Rajkumar, with lyrics penned by Kala Samrat S. Narayan.

Reception
Vishnuvardhan's performance received appreciative comments from several reviewers.  Former Prime Minister H. D. Deve Gowda thought the film had a "strong message".

References

2006 films
2000s Kannada-language films
Films directed by S. Narayan
Rockline Entertainments films
Kannada remakes of Telugu films